Christopher Sheldrake is a perfumer who has created perfumes for Chanel, Shiseido, Serge Lutens, Rochas, Avon and SpaceNK.

References

External links
Fragrance Foundation Bio

Perfumers
History of cosmetics
Living people
Year of birth missing (living people)
Place of birth missing (living people)